The Other Side is the second album by the British R&B singer, Lynden David Hall, released in 2000 on the Cooltempo label. It peaked at #36 on the UK albums chart.

Track listing 
All tracks composed by Lynden David Hall
 "If I Had to Choose" – 4:08  
 "Forgive Me" – 3:58  
 "Say It Ain't So" – 4:14  
 "U Let Him Have U" – 4:53  
 "Hard Way" – 3:50  
 "Where's God?" – 4:18  
 "To Be a Man" – 5:32  
 "The Other Side" – 4:00  
 "Don't Wanna Talk" – 3:37  
 "Wanna Be Another You" – 5:21  
 "Sleeping With Victor" – 3:35  
 "Dead and Gone" – 4:56  
 "Let's Do It Again" – 4:10  
 "Are We Still Cool?" – 3:43

Singles 
 2000 - "Forgive Me" (UK #30)
 2000 - "Sleeping With Victor" (UK #49)
 2000 - "Let's Do It Again" (UK #69)

External links
 Lynden David Hall interview by Pete Lewis, Blues & Soul, May 2000 (reprinted April 2008)

Lynden David Hall albums
2000 albums
Cooltempo Records albums